Marsha Harris was the female winner of the 1998 Walter Byers Award, the National Collegiate Athletic Association's highest academic honor, in recognition of being the nation's top female scholar-athlete.  She was a two-time Kodak Division III All-American who scored the winning basket for the New York University Violets women's basketball team in the 1997 NCAA Division III National Championship game resulting in a 72–70 victory over University of Wisconsin–Eau Claire.  As of 2005 she was the University Athletic Association's all-time leading scorer and she was in her third year as a surgical resident at the New York University School of Medicine.

Notes

American women's basketball players
Living people
NYU Violets women's basketball players
Year of birth missing (living people)